At the 1998 Goodwill Games, two different gymnastics disciplines were contested: artistic gymnastics and rhythmic gymnastics.

Artistic Gymnastics

Medalists

Rhythmic Gymnastics

Medalists

Details

Artistic Gymnastics

Men

Individual All-Around

Floor

Pommel Horse

Rings

Vault

Parallel Bars

High Bar

Women

Individual All-Around

Vault

Uneven Bars

Balance Beam

Floor

Mixed

Pairs

Rhythmic Gymnastics

Individual All-Around

Hoop

Rope

Clubs

Ribbon

Medal table

Overall

Men

Women

References

Gymnastics at the 1998 Goodwill Games
1998 Goodwill Games